Van Heurn's rainbowfish (Melanotaenia vanheurni) is a species of rainbowfish in the subfamily Melanotaeniinae. It is endemic to West Papua in Indonesia. The specific name honours the Dutch zoologist Willem Cornelis van Heurn (1887-1972).

References

Melanotaenia
Freshwater fish of Western New Guinea
Taxonomy articles created by Polbot
Fish described in 1922